Robinson Pitalúa Támara (September 3, 1964 – September 22, 1985) was a Colombian boxer, who represented his native country at the 1984 Summer Olympics in Los Angeles in the Men's Bantamweight division.

Born in Montería, Córdoba Pitalúa won the bronze medal in the same weight category a year earlier at the 1983 Pan American Games. He died in a drowning accident 1985 in Miami, Florida, USA.

Achievements 
IX Bolivarian Games, Barquisimeto, VEN, 1981. Silver. Lost to Manuel Vilchez.
III World Championship, Munich, GER, 1982. Ninth place. Lost to Klaus-Dieter Kirchstein.
Inter-Continental Tournament, Colorado Springs, USA, 1982. Gold. Defeated Héctor López.
II Suramerican Championship, Guayaquil, ECU, 1983. Silver. Lost to Manuel Vilchez.
Pan American Games, Caracas, VEN, 1983. Bronze. Lost to Pedro Nolasco.
Olympic Festival, Mexico, MEX, 1984. Gold.
XXIII Olympic Games, Los Angeles, USA, 1984. Fifth place. Defeated Hugh Dyer and Barbar Ali Khan. Lost to Maurizio Stecca.
Four-time National Champion.
Amateur record: 83-12-0.
Professional debut: November 23, 1984 against Manuel Mendoza.
Professional Record: 6-0-0, 4 KO's.

References

Jaime Castro-Núñez. La Canción de Robinson. 2008

External links
  Spanish Sports Blog about Pitalúa

1964 births
1985 deaths
Bantamweight boxers
Olympic boxers of Colombia
Pan American Games bronze medalists for Colombia
Boxers at the 1983 Pan American Games
Boxers at the 1984 Summer Olympics
Deaths by drowning in the United States
Accidental deaths in Florida
Colombian male boxers
Pan American Games medalists in boxing
Medalists at the 1983 Pan American Games
20th-century Colombian people